Crosswinds is the third album by soul vocalist  Peabo Bryson. Released in late 1978, the album reached number three on the US R&B albums chart.

Track listing
All tracks composed by Peabo Bryson.
"Crosswinds" - 6:02   	
"I'm So Into You" - 5:45 	
"Smile" - 4:45 	
"She's a Woman" - 5:20 	
"Point of View" - 4:40 	
"Spread Your Wings" - 4:58 	
"Don't Touch Me" - 4:55 	
"Love is Watching You" - 5:05

Personnel 
 Peabo Bryson – lead and backing vocals, keyboards, horn arrangements, BGV arrangements
 Thomas Campbell – keyboards
Patrice Rushen – ARP synthesizer
 Jim Boling – ARP synthesizer, flute
 Richard Horton – guitars
 Dwight W. Watkins – bass, backing vocals
 Andre Robinson – drums
 Louis Palomo – percussion
 Ron Dover – saxophone solos (3, 7), flute
 Daniel Dillard – trombone
 Thaddeus Johnson – trumpet
 Clare Fischer – string arrangements (1, 3–6)
 Johnny Pate – horn arrangements, BGV arrangements, string arrangements (2, 7, 8)
 Gerald Vinci – concertmaster
 Chuck Bryson – backing vocals
 Terry Dukes – backing vocals

Production 
 Produced and Mixed by Peabo Bryson and Johnny Pate.
 Executive Producer – Larkin Arnold
 Recorded by Dave Iveland
 Assistant Engineer – Richard Cottrell
 Mastered by Bernie Grundman
 Recorded, Mixed and Mastered at A&M Studios (Hollywood, CA).
 Art Direction – Roy Kohara
 Design – Art Sims
 Photography – Claude Mougin

Charts

Singles

External links
 Peabo Bryson-Crosswinds at Discogs

References

1978 albums
Peabo Bryson albums
Albums arranged by Johnny Pate
Albums produced by Johnny Pate
Capitol Records albums